A victims' rights group is a type of advocacy group which advocates or lobbies for legal, social or political change on behalf of victims of serious crime or injustice. Members of such groups often include family members or friends of such victims.

See also
Mothers Against Drunk Driving
Mothers of Murdered Offspring

External links
The National Center for Victims of Crime
Office for Victims of Crime
National Crime Victim Law Institute
Maryland Crime Victims' Resource Center, Inc.

 
Criminology organizations